Morristown National Historical Park is a United States National Historical Park, headquartered in Morristown, New Jersey, consisting of four sites important during the American Revolutionary War: Jockey Hollow, the Ford Mansion, Fort Nonsense and the New Jersey Brigade Encampment site.

The sites are located in Morristown and Harding Township, both in Morris County, and in Bernardsville in Somerset County.

With its establishment on March 2, 1933, Morristown became the country's first National Historical Park. It was added to the National Register of Historic Places on October 15, 1966, for its significance in archaeology, architecture and military history.

Sites
Jockey Hollow, a few miles south of Morristown along Route 202 in Harding Twp., was the site of a Continental Army encampment. It was from here that the entire Pennsylvania contingent mutinied and later, 200 New Jersey soldiers attempted to emulate them.

Fort Nonsense occupied a high hilltop overlooking Morristown, and is believed to have been the site of a signal fire, along with earthworks.

The Ford Mansion, in Morristown proper, was the site of the "hard winter" (December 1779 – May 1780) quarters of George Washington and the Continental Army. That winter remains the coldest on record for New Jersey. Theodosia Ford, widow of Jacob Ford Jr., and her four children shared their household with Washington, his staff, including Alexander Hamilton, along with their servants and sometimes, their family members. Martha Washington traveled to Morristown to spend the winter with her husband.

Washington's Headquarters Museum, the adjacent museum is open to the public Wednesday thru Sunday from September–June and seven days a week from July- August from 9:30 AM to 5:00 PM.  The museum has three exhibit rooms and a sales area.  A video production "Morristown: Where America Survived" (New Jersey Network/2009) is shown. The Ford Mansion is shown only by guided tour which begin in the Museum.The Museum hosted one of the events of the CelebrateHAMILTON 2015 program: hosted by the Alexander Hamilton Awareness Society, a talk by Author and Historian Michael E. Newton - "Hamilton's Revolutionary War Services", who also presented  his book "Alexander Hamilton: The Formative Years." at the same event.

The New Jersey Brigade Encampment Site is located south of Jockey Hollow, mostly in Bernardsville, Somerset County. It was used by about 1,300 soldiers during the winter of 1779–80.

Park history
In April 1932, the National Park Service (NPS) published a report recommending that the site of the Continental Army's winter encampments in 1776-77 and 1779-80 become a "Federal Historical Reserve"; the report included two sites: Jockey Hollow and the Ford Mansion.

In January 1933, a conference consisting of representatives of the NPS, the Secretary of the Interior, and civic and business leaders from the Morris County area, drafted a bill supporting the concept of a national historical park, with  "the rank and dignity equal to the scenic program in the West."

The bill for creating the Morristown National Historical Park was submitted in mid-January (H.R. 14302; S. 5469), with the support of Secretary Ray Lyman Wilbur, who called it "the most important park project before this department at the present time."

In March 1933, in the last days of Herbert Hoover's presidency, the 72nd Congress established Morristown as the country's first National Historical Park.

See also
National Register of Historic Places listings in Morris County, New Jersey

References

External links

National Park Service: Morristown National Historical Park
NPS Museum Exhibit: Morristown
NJ Skylands: Morristown National Historical Park
StateParks: Morristown National Historical Park
NY-NJTC: Morristown National Historical Park Trail Details and Info

 
Parks on the National Register of Historic Places in New Jersey
Parks in New Jersey
American Revolutionary War sites
Morristown, New Jersey
Protected areas established in 1933
National Historical Parks in New Jersey
Parks in Morris County, New Jersey
Museums in Morristown, New Jersey
American Revolutionary War museums in New Jersey
Historic house museums in New Jersey
National Register of Historic Places in Morris County, New Jersey
National Register of Historic Places in Somerset County, New Jersey
Presidency of Herbert Hoover
New Jersey Register of Historic Places
American Revolution on the National Register of Historic Places
1933 establishments in New Jersey
National Historical Parks of the United States